The Real Blonde is a 1997 film directed and written by Tom DiCillo. It stars Matthew Modine, Catherine Keener, and Maxwell Caulfield. The film is a satire of New York's fashion and entertainment industries.

Plot
Joe is an aspiring actor working as a bus boy in a high-class restaurant. His longtime girlfriend Mary works as a cosmetician for the fashion industry and largely supports him with her steady income. Joe is more concerned with expressing himself than getting a paying job, and has been unwilling to accept roles that do not live up to his artistic standard. Mary supports Joe, but urges him to accept any role to get his foot in the door. Meanwhile, his co-worker Bob lands a lucrative role on a soap opera. Bob is a classically trained actor, but is willing to overlook the quality of the material for the money. He also has a fetish for natural blonde women, leading him to date Sahara, a naive model, and then dump her after discovering that her hair is dyed.

Joe swallows his artistic pride and meets with an agent, Dee Dee Taylor, who arranges for him to be an extra in a Madonna video. Mary is harassed as she walks to work each day and begins taking a self-defense and anger management class on the advice of her therapist. The instructor encourages her to express her anger, and she finds the class extremely empowering. Bob is successful in his soap opera role and begins a relationship with his beautiful co-star Kelly, a "real blonde".

At the Madonna video, the director treats Joe and the other extras like cattle. Joe meets Madonna's body double, Tina, a friendly aspiring actress, and gets himself fired for protesting an anti-Semitic statement made by the assistant director. Joe's firing sparks an argument between Joe and Mary. The pressure of Joe's career is straining their relationship, and they have not had sex in a long time. Mary's instructor, Doug, gives her a ride home from her class and makes a pass at her. She rebuffs him, but lies to cover up the incident to Joe. Meanwhile, Bob suffers from erectile dysfunction and is unable to have sex with Kelly. She mocks his inadequacy and leaves him.

Dee Dee takes pity on Joe and allows him to audition for the role of a "sexy serial killer". He reads his lines with Tina and begins to improvise his dialogue. He impresses the producers and lands the role. Tina invites him out for a drink and he resists her advances with some difficulty. Mary meets with her therapist and tells him about her experience with her self-defense instructor. He tells her that she must become comfortable with men showing their attraction to her and begins sharing his own sexual fantasies about her. She storms out of the session. Meanwhile, Bob is negotiating a longtime contract on the soap opera, but Kelly continues to taunt him on set. Bob threatens to quit the show and then forces the producer to kill off Kelly's character.

Bob goes back to dating Sahara, with whom he is miserable. Joe breaks the big news about his role to Mary and they rejoice. Mary asks him if she is wrong for feeling angry when men hit on her. Joe supports her and threatens to beat up her therapist if he ever sees him again. They have sex for the first time in months and drift off to sleep, happy and satisfied. Mary wraps her hand around Joe's finger, revealing that his improvised monologue had been about his feelings for her.

Cast
Matthew Modine as Joe, an aspiring actor with strong opinions
Catherine Keener as Mary, Joe's longtime girlfriend and a successful makeup artist
Maxwell Caulfield as Bob, an actor with a fetish for natural blondes
Daryl Hannah as Kelly, a blonde soap-opera star 
Bridgette Wilson as Sahara, a naive model with dyed blonde hair
Marlo Thomas as Blair, a fashion photographer and Mary's boss
Kathleen Turner as Dee Dee Taylor, a prominent talent agent
Elizabeth Berkley as Tina, an aspiring actress who works as Madonna's double.
Denis Leary as Doug, Mary's self-defense instructor
Steve Buscemi as Nick, the director for Madonna's video
Dave Chappelle as Zee, the assistant director for Madonna's video
Christopher Lloyd as Ernst, a head waiter and Joe's boss
Beatrice Winde as Wilma

Reception
The movie received mixed reviews from critics and currently holds a 34% approval rating on Rotten Tomatoes, with an average score of 5.4.

Chicago Sun-Times film critic Roger Ebert gave the film 3 out of 4 stars, and wrote:[Director/writer DiCillo] devises brief, sharply observed scenes. He notices, for example, the way a makeup artist makes up not only a model's face but also her attitude. The way the karate instructor, playing an aggressor, takes a sly pleasure in using sexist insults. The way people talk knowledgeably about movies they haven't seen. The way a guy who's embarrassed to be in a porno store will brazen it out. All of the actors are right for their roles because a degree of typecasting has been done, but Daryl Hannah brings a particularly focused energy to the role of a soap opera actress who is not impressed that a guy is impressed by her. And Catherine Keener brings a wry wit to her character; she sees models on Times Square billboards and knows what it took to get them there.<p>The characters are articulate enough to talk about what really moves them; they don't play sitcom games. DiCillo never puts two and two together, but somehow it all adds up.

Owen Gleiberman of Entertainment Weekly awarded it a C+, commenting "the movie, an attack on superficiality, never quite makes it out of the shallow end." Marc Savlov of  The Austin Chronicle labelled it a "very crowded movie that babbles endlessly without ever saying very much."

References

External links
 
 
 
 
 

1997 films
1997 comedy films
American comedy films
American satirical films
Films about actors
Films directed by Tom DiCillo
Films produced by Tom Rosenberg
Films set in New York City
Films shot in New York City
Lakeshore Entertainment films
Paramount Pictures films
1990s English-language films
1990s American films